Ronald "Trousers" Smith (May 3, 1943 – June 2, 2013) was an American football defensive back and return specialist.  He played professionally in the National Football League (NFL) for ten season with five teams: the Chicago Bears (1965, 1970–1972), the Atlanta Falcons (1966–1967), the Los Angeles Rams (1968–1969), the San Diego Chargers (1973), and the Oakland Raiders (1974). He was traded along with Jim Seymour from the Rams to the Bears for Dick Evey on September 1, 1970. He went to the Pro Bowl after the 1972 season as a kick returner.

On June 2, 2013, Smith died in Denver, Colorado from lung cancer.

References

External links
 

1943 births
2013 deaths
American football defensive backs
American football return specialists
Atlanta Falcons players
Chicago Bears players
Los Angeles Rams players
Oakland Raiders players
San Diego Chargers players
Wisconsin Badgers football players
National Conference Pro Bowl players
Players of American football from Chicago
Sportspeople from East Chicago, Indiana
Players of American football from Indiana
Deaths from lung cancer
Deaths from cancer in Colorado